Caergwrle railway station serves the village of Caergwrle in Flintshire, Wales. The station is 4¾ miles (7 km) north of Wrexham Central on the Borderlands Line.

History
The station was opened as Bridge End in June 1872. From 1885, the station had a signal box towards the southern end of the Wrexham-bound platform, which was named Caergwrle Castle Station signal box from 1898 until 1972, On 1 January 1899, the station itself was renamed to Caergwrle Castle, with the & Wells suffix being included from 1 October 1908. By 1912, the station had a lengthy siding, extending to the north-west, to the Lascelles and Sharman brewery.

The station was renamed from Caergwrle Castle & Wells to Caergwrle on 6 May 1974, and the signal box was closed on 28 November 1982.

Facilities
The station is unstaffed and has no ticketing provision, so these must be purchased on the train or in advance of travel. There are waiting shelters on both platforms - the one on the southbound side is of brick construction and uses a design unique to this particular route. The only other amenities provided are CIS displays and timetable poster boards on each side and a bike stand on platform 1 (the former building on the northbound side was demolished after the station became unstaffed in 1969). No step-free access is available to either platform.

Services
In the evenings and on bank holidays, this drops to one every second hour. There is a train every 90 minutes in each direction on Sundays.

Gallery

References

Sources

External links

Railway stations in Flintshire
DfT Category F2 stations
Former Great Central Railway stations
Railway stations in Great Britain opened in 1872
Railway stations served by Transport for Wales Rail